The 2022 Big Ten baseball tournament was held at Charles Schwab Field Omaha in Omaha, Nebraska, from May 26 through 29. As the tournament champion, Michigan earned the Big Ten Conference's automatic bid to the 2022 NCAA Division I baseball tournament. The tournament aired on the Big Ten Network. This was the first tournament since 2019 after the previous two tournaments were cancelled due to the COVID-19 pandemic.

Format and seeding
The 2022 tournament was an eight team double-elimination tournament. The top eight teams based on conference regular season winning percentage earned invites to the tournament. The teams then played a double-elimination tournament leading to a single championship game.

Bracket

Schedule

References

Tournament
Big Ten Baseball Tournament
Big Ten baseball tournament